Türgen (lit. "quicker") is a mountain of the Altai Mountains and located in the Uvs Province in Mongolia. Its peak Deglii Tsagaan (heron the white) has an elevation of 4,029 metres and is snow-capped.

See also 
 List of Ultras of Central Asia

References

External links 
 "Turgen Uul, Mongolia" on Peakbagger

Mountains of Mongolia
Altai Mountains
Uvs Province